Bidyendu Mohan Deb (born 1942) is an Indian theoretical chemist, chemical physicist and a professor at the Indian Institute of Science Education and Research, Kolkata (IISER). he is known for his studies in theoretical chemistry and chemical physics. He is an elected fellow of the International Union of Pure and Applied Chemistry, The World Academy of Sciences, Indian National Science Academy  and the Indian Academy of Sciences. The Council of Scientific and Industrial Research, the apex agency of the Government of India for scientific research, awarded him the Shanti Swarup Bhatnagar Prize for Science and Technology, one of the highest Indian science awards, in 1981, for his contributions to chemical sciences.

Biography 
B. M. Deb, born on 27 September 1942 in the Indian state of Bengal when the pre-independent India was going through the Quit India movement, graduated in chemistry (BSc hons) from Presidency College, Kolkata (present-day Presidency University) and completed his master's degree from the Rajabazar Science College, with physical chemistry as the principal subject. Subsequently, he joined S. R. Palit at the Indian Association for the Cultivation of Science (IACS) and after a year, he moved to the Mathematical Institute, University of Oxford on a Commonwealth scholarship from where he passed the Diploma in Advanced Mathematics. Continuing at the institution, he did his doctoral research under Charles Coulson, a pioneer of quantum theory of matter, to secure a DPhil in mathematics.

Deb started his career which spanned across several institutions at Indian Association for the Cultivation of Science as a CSIR pool officer in 1969 but a year later, moved to the Indian Institute of Technology, Mumbai as a member of faculty. In 1971, he was appointed as an assistant professor at the Birla Institute of Technology and Science, Pilani but after a brief stint of one year, he returned to IIT Mumbai where he spent the next 12 years, serving as an assistant professor (1973–78) and as a professor (1978–84). His next move was to Panjab University as the professor of theoretical chemistry in 1984 and after a service of two decades he superannuated from there in 2004. Post-retirement, he moved to S. N. Bose National Centre for Basic Sciences, Kolkata as ISRO Vikram Sarabhai Research Professor under the Jawaharlal Nehru Centre for Advanced Scientific Research, Bangalore. In 2007, he took up an Adjunct/Visiting Professorship at the newly established Indian Institute for Science Education and Research, Kolkata. Currently, he serves  as an INSA Senior Scientist and Honorary Scholar-in-Residence at Visva-Bharati University.

Legacy 

Deb's main contributions are in the field of theoretical chemistry and the molecular geometry model he developed to demonstrate the influence of electronuclear attractive force and the highest occupied molecular orbital in the determination of molecular shapes is reported to be a notable one. His work on the applicability of the concept of internal stresses of molecules and solids revealed their relation to the density-functional theory and quantum fluid dynamics. He developed methodologies for predicting new molecules using quantum chemistry and for combining cellular automata with Thomas-Fermi-Dirac theory.

One of the early pioneers of the electron density theory in chemistry, Deb's main focus was on developing the foundations for a possible density-based alternative quantum mechanics bypassing the Schrödinger equation and the many-electron wave-function. He emphasized the general interpretative aspects of the electron density in chemistry. For both these ends, he concentrated on developing a single time-dependent equation (the Deb-Chattaraj or DC equation) for the direct calculation of electron density, which is different from the usual density functional theory.

His researches have been documented in many articles published in journals of repute and he has published two books, The Force Concept in Chemistry and The Single-Particle Density in Physics and Chemistry. Besides, he has also written about holistic education as well as on Satyajit Ray, one of the pioneers of modern Indian cinema. His writings have been cited by many authors and he has guided seventeen doctoral and post-doctoral scholars in their studies. He was also involved with curriculum designing programs and seminars and has been associated with science journals as a member of their editorial boards.

Prof. Deb is widely considered as a scholar of arts and literature of both eastern and western worlds. Recently his lifelong enthusiasm and passion for Indology and its connection to the world heritage is culminated in the book "The peacock in splendour: Science, literature and arts in ancient and medieval India". "A result of long and painstaking research over many years, this refreshing and structured book is a pioneering effort to examine the intellectual dimensions of Indian holism. It provides an encyclopedic and illuminating account of the three major entangled strands of Indian Science, Literature and Art covering nearly 5,000 years of the holistic Indian civilization, from about 3300 B.C. to around 1600 A.D. This book will be an exciting read for not only intelligent and interested laypersons, but also for students, teachers and scholars in sciences, technologies, humanities – including fine arts and performing arts – as well as social sciences."

Pedagogy 
A major part of Deb's academic career was spent in teaching as well as course and curriculum development. He developed and taught a myriad of undergraduate and postgraduate theory courses on general chemistry; general physical chemistry; atomic and molecular spectroscopy; quantum chemistry; quantum mechanics of many-electron systems; symmetry in chemistry; equilibrium statistical mechanics; mathematics for chemists; classical and quantum theories of adsorption on solid surfaces; bonding, structure and symmetry; density-functional theory; Indian heritage in science, literature and art. Deb also designed and implemented a number of experiments, including integrated and open-ended experiments, in the teaching laboratory for undergraduate and postgraduate laboratory courses on general chemistry, physical chemistry and inorganic chemistry.

Deb's passion for teaching encompassed being true to all his students and to the subjects being taught. His teaching methods were all student-centred. Even when teachers from other institutions sat in his classes, they became his students. Deb adopted primarily a chalk-and-blackboard approach, with every mathematical equation written on the blackboard being physically interpreted. In case difficult/ complicated diagrams were to be shown, he used different methods of presentation in which 4 colours were invariably employed for visual appeal, inspired by the topological 4-colour map concept.

Deb adopted a median level of teaching with encouragement to all students to face their own intellectual challenges. His discourses emphasized on students’ understanding of the concepts because, according to Deb, “concepts are the fragrance of science”. He encouraged students to ask questions (“no questions are stupid”) in the classroom and to use the library as much as possible. He also advised them to be very strong in fundamentals so they could tackle unknown problems fearlessly.

Deb sought to keep students constantly interested in the subject at hand. Two notable aspects in this instance are: (i) In a longish derivation, he would casually introduce a twist for unsuspecting students and finally obtain a result which was unacceptable and could even be ridiculous. (ii) In a spectroscopy course – which would show the students many peaks -  Deb took all the students along with a blackboard and chalk to the top of a 500-foot hill (which he had already climbed) to teach them molecular spectra and molecular structure on a few occasions. Deb felt it was necessary for students to realize that “innovations cannot become routine and must remain unpredictable”. The only external influence in Deb's teaching of any course was that it should be at par with the best teaching available globally on that course and he never followed any icon.

Over a span of 45 years, Deb has delivered invited series of lectures at national workshops on chemistry, physics and mathematics, and numerous seminar/special lectures in chemistry and physics departments in India and abroad. He had also communicated excitement in chemical sciences and science in general, through instructional lectures to high school as well as junior college students. He has frequently used examples from Indian and western art in both expert and educational lectures.

Deb's philosophy of holistic science education in general and chemical education in particular, is encapsulated through his own words : "Learning of sciences cannot be achieved satisfactorily by confining different subjects into separate air-tight compartments each of which may further have air-tight sub-compartments. Science learning has to be multi-disciplinary and liberal, roaming across boundaries, with an understanding of aesthetics and fine arts as well.”  This educational philosophy has been laid down in detail in a number of articles in journals, namely, Science and Culture (Kolkata), Journal of Higher Education (UGC, New Delhi), Social Sciences Research Journal (Chandigarh), Current Science (Bangalore), Journal of Chemical Education (USA) as well as in a number of invited lectures at national-level symposia/ conferences on education.  

Deb has played a significant role as a conceptualiser and as a member/convener of the various institutional and national committees involved in upgrading and modernisation of quite a few prominent educational curricula in India. He has always been available as a friend, philosopher and guide to his students and young faculty members. His life-long passion about understanding and application of concepts have also played a very important role in his research.

Awards and honors 
The Council of Scientific and Industrial Research awarded Deb the Shanti Swarup Bhatnagar Prize, one of the highest Indian science awards, in 1981.  A guest scholar of the Kyoto University in 1989 and an honorary professor of the Jawaharlal Nehru Centre for Advanced Scientific Research from 1992 to 2004, he received the Sir C. V. Raman Award in Physical Sciences of the University Grants Commission of India in 1988, Biennial Professor S. R. Palit Memorial Award of the Indian Association for the Cultivation of Science in 1995 and the FICCI Award in Physical Sciences in 1996. He is also a recipient of the Silver Medal (2000) and the Gold Medal (2015) of the Chemical Research Society of India. The list of award orations he has delivered include Linus Pauling Memorial Lecture of Mahatma Gandhi University (1996), Professor Sadhan Basu Memorial Lecture of the Indian National Science Academy (1999), Mitra Memorial Lecture of Delhi University (2000), A. V. Rama Rao Foundation Lecture of Jawaharlal Nehru Centre for Advanced Scientific Research (2003), Distinguished Lectures and Institute/University colloquia at a number of national institutions including Panjab University Colloquium of 2016. The Indian Academy of Sciences elected him as a fellow in 1984 and he became a fellow of the Indian National Science Academy in 1987. He is also an elected fellow of The World Academy of Sciences and the International Union of Pure and Applied Chemistry. In 2019, Deb was conferred a Life-time Achievement Award from the Indian Chemical Society (estd. 1924) and received this at the Annual Convention of Chemists, Raipur, India.

Citations

Selected bibliography

Books

Articles

See also 
 Charles Coulson

Notes

References

Further reading 
 

Recipients of the Shanti Swarup Bhatnagar Award in Chemical Science
1942 births
Scientists from Kolkata
Bengali scientists
Living people
20th-century Indian chemists
Indian scientific authors
Presidency University, Kolkata alumni
University of Calcutta alumni
Alumni of the University of Oxford
Academic staff of IIT Bombay
Academic staff of Panjab University
Academic staff of Birla Institute of Technology and Science, Pilani
Fellows of the Indian Academy of Sciences
Fellows of the Indian National Science Academy
TWAS fellows